Nymphicula saigusai is a moth in the family Crambidae. It was described by Yoshiyasu in 1980. It is found in Japan (Kyushu, Shikoku, Honshu).

The length of the forewings is 6.2 mm for males and 6.5 mm for females. The forewings are pale orange, but fuscous from the base to white antemedial band. The area between the antemedial band and medial area is pale orange, bordered with fuscous and tinged with fuscous near the costa. The hindwings are fuscous from the base to the white antemedial band. The area between the antemedial band and medial area is pale orange.

The larvae feed on Jungermannia truncata, feeding from within a case. They have a milky white body and a shining black head. Full-grown larvae reach a length of 5.5-7.8 mm.

References

Nymphicula
Moths described in 1980